Antonio Carmona (born 1965) is a Spanish gypsy singer of flamenco. 

Antonio Carmona may also refer to:

 Óscar Carmona (António Óscar Fragoso Carmona, 1869–1951), prime minister and president of Portugal
 Antonio Carmona Añorve (fl. 2001), director of police of Mexicali, later convicted
 Carmona Rodrigues (António Pedro Nobre Carmona Rodrigues, born 1956), Portuguese professor and politician